Fortezza da Basso is a fort inserted in the fourteenth century walls of Florence.  Its official name is the Fortress of Saint John the Baptist (Fortezza di San Giovanni Battista).  In modern times it is home to numerous conferences, concerts and national and international exhibitions, such as Pitti Immagine. Its total area is nearly 100,000 square meters.

Construction
Fortezza da Basso was designed by Antonio da Sangallo the Younger for Alessandro de' Medici, Duke of Florence, also called The Moor, and built between 1534 and 1537. It is the largest historical monument of Florence.

Images

References

Tourist attractions in Florence
Buildings and structures in Florence
Forts in Italy